Redbridge is a community with a local services board in the Canadian province of Ontario, located in the Nipissing District. It is situated north-east of North Bay along Highway 63. It has one elementary school, Phelps Central Public School. There is also a library, fire hall, and a recreation centre.

The area is counted as part of Nipissing, Unorganized, North Part in Statistics Canada census data.

References

Communities in Nipissing District
Local services boards in Ontario